St Leonard's Forest SSSI is an  biological Site of Special Scientific Interest east of Horsham in West Sussex. The SSSI is in two separate areas, with the western part being in the  Forestry Commission managed  St Leonard's Forest.

Much of the forest is deciduous woodland, which is dominated by pedunculate oak, silver birch, common birch and beech. The humid microclimate of a narrow valley has allowed mosses and liverworts to survive which indicate continuous woodland cover for the past 5,000 years. Butterflies include the rare purple emperor.

There is public access to the western part of the site.

References

Sites of Special Scientific Interest in West Sussex